Turk Pettit (born November 16, 1998) is an American professional golfer who plays on the Asian Tour. He won the 2021 NCAA Division I Men's Golf Championship. Pettit picked up his first professional win at the 2021 Birck Boilermaker Classic on the Forme Tour.

Early life and amateur career
Pettit played collegiate golf at Clemson University. Pettit won the 2021 NCAA Division I Men's Golf Championship at the Grayhawk Golf Club in Scottsdale, Arizona. In 2021, Pettit was also named a first-team All-American by the Collegiate Golf Coaches Association.

Professional career
On his third start on the Forme Tour, Pettit won the 2021 Birck Boilermaker Classic.  In 2022, Petit joined LIV Golf, and later resigned his membership of the PGA Tour. Following the start of the first LIV Golf Invitational Series event, the PGA Tour announced that all current and former members who participated in LIV events would be indefinitely suspended from all tours operated by the tour.

Amateur wins
2018 Irish Creek Intercollegiate
2021 NCAA Division I Men's Golf Championship

Professional wins (1)

Forme Tour wins (1)

References

External links

Profile on Clemson's official athletic site

American male golfers
LIV Golf players
Clemson Tigers men's golfers
Golfers from North Carolina
1998 births
Living people